Prof John William Henry Eyre FRSE (1869–1944) was a British bacteriologist and ophthalmologist, specialising in the bacteriology of the eye.

Life
He was born in London on 18 July 1869 the son of John Eyre. He was educated privately and at Whitgift School in London. In 1889 he entered Guy’s Hospital Medical School which linked to a Diploma at the University of Durham graduating MB in 1893, followed by a course in Public Health at Cambridge University.

In 1899 he was elected a Fellow of the Royal Society of Edinburgh. His proposers were Robert Howden, Sir Thomas Oliver, Angus MacGillivray, and Sir German Sims Woodhead

In 1899 he moved to Charing Cross Hospital and in 1900 became the first recipient of the Ernest Hart Memorial Research Scholarship. In 1906 he spent the summer in Malta having been co-opted onto the Royal Society Commission on Mediterranean Fever. He was Vice-President of the Royal Microscopical Society.

From 1920 to 1934 he was Professor of Bacteriology at the University of London (attached to Guy's Hospital). He retired in 1934 and died on 17 February 1944.

Publications
The Elements of Bacteriological Technique (1902) several later editions
Serums, Vaccines and Toxines in Treatment and Diagnoses (1910)

References

1869 births
1944 deaths
Fellows of the Royal Society of Edinburgh
British ophthalmologists
British microbiologists
Alumni of Durham University College of Medicine
People educated at Whitgift School